Scopula mollicula is a moth of the  family Geometridae. It is found on Madagascar.

This species is similar to Scopula caducaria (Swinhoe, 1904) in size, shape and coloration but less glossy.
Both wings bear a strong cell-dot, median and postmedian lines of the forewings are placed more distally than in S.caducaria.

References

mollicula
Moths described in 1932
Taxa named by Louis Beethoven Prout
Moths of Madagascar
Moths of Africa